Angascocha (possibly from Quechua anqas blue, qucha lake) is a mountain in the northern part of the Chonta mountain range in the Andes of Peru, about  high. It is situated in the Huancavelica Region, Huancavelica Province, Acobambilla District, near the border with the Junín Region. Angascocha lies north of Huch'uy Anqas and northeast of the lake named Anqasqucha.

References

Mountains of Huancavelica Region
Mountains of Peru